Mental Weather is a studio album by american jazz saxophonist Jane Ira Bloom. The album was released on January 30, 2008 by Outline Records label.

Reception
Mike Shanley of JazzTimes commented, "Mental Weather begins and ends delicately, with Jane Ira Bloom’s soprano sax dueting with pianist Dawn Clement, and later standing alone, playing the standard “This Nearly Was Mine” following an original rumination. In both situations, Bloom’s engaging tone and sense of lyricism come across in the first few notes, which indicates why she has been such a highly regarded and lauded musician. And whether the album sticks to that subdued approach or amps things up a bit, the performance keeps the interest level high." All About Jazz 's John Kelman stated, "Cleverly skirting the edges of the avant without losing sight of the importance of melody, Mental Weather is a compelling evolutionary set for Bloom, whose career continues to be marked by gradual but inexorable growth." Michael G. Nastos of AllMusic noted, "This is a complete and wonderful recording from start to finish, track-to-track, and continues to proffer the notion that Jane Ira Bloom is at the peak of her formative powers. It's a project that cannot come more highly recommended." The Buffalo News 's Jeff Simon added, "There are no bad Jane Ira Bloom records. She's a national treasure. One way or another, every new disc of hers proves it."

Track listing

Personnel
Jane Ira Bloom – soprano saxophone
Mark Helias – double bass
Matt Wilson – drums, percussion
Dawn Clement – piano, electric piano

References

External links

Jane Ira Bloom albums
2008 albums